During the 2014–15 English football season, Crewe Alexandra F.C. competed in Football League One, their 91st season in the English Football League.

Match details

Pre-season

League One

League table

Matches
The fixtures for the 2014–15 season were announced on 18 June 2014 at 9am.

FA Cup

The draw for the first round of the FA Cup was made on 27 October 2014.

League Cup

The draw for the first round was made on 17 June 2014 at 10am. Crewe Alexandra were drawn at away to Barnsley.

Football League Trophy

Transfers

In

Out

Loans in

Loans out

References

Crewe Alexandra F.C. seasons
Crewe Alexandra